Dawid Kujawa (born April 13, 1981 in Zielona Góra, Poland) is a Polish former speedway rider. In 2001 he finished first in the World Under-21 Championship. He rode for the Newport Wasps in the United Kingdom in 2004 but quit after just one meeting.

Honours

World Under-21 Championship
2001 - World Champion (12 points)

Polish Under-21 Pairs Championship
2001 - Polish Champion
2002 - 2nd place

Silver Helmet (U-21)
2001 - 3rd place

References

See also 
 Poland speedway team

1981 births
Living people
Polish speedway riders
Newport Wasps riders
People from Zielona Góra
Sportspeople from Lubusz Voivodeship